Paredon Records was a record label founded in 1969 by Barbara Dane and Irwin Silber to publish recordings of cultural expressions, especially protests, in order to preserve them. Paredon wanted to spread awareness to the multiple movements and topics. Dane and Co-founder Irwin Silber were both connected to politically engaged artists and musicians, as well as progressive groups, through their work. Barbara formed friendships with artists she met while protesting the Vietnam War and other current events. Her active participation in these movements provided her with the inside knowledge and ear to recognize whose voices would be historically significant. Part of the era's social activism and movements for economic, racial, and social justice as well as national liberation, the label released fifty titles between 1970 and 1985 including songs, poetry, and oratory. The label's founders were inspired by Cuba and recorded a lot of protest music, including The People Gonna Rise! with Bev Grant's band Human Condition.

Dane and Silber donated Paredon Records to the Smithsonian Institution in 1991 "to insure the availability of this material to posterity" and their recordings are now part of Smithsonian Folkways.
Barbara performed in front of large crowds of students and workers across the country and on national television, while Irwin addressed meetings of cultural leaders and intellectuals. Bravo planned a conference of international artists participating in global political movements the following year to share their songs and views. The Encuentro de Canción Protesta, which took place at the Casa de las Américas, encouraged Dane and Silber to start a record label in order to make the voices of the people heard.

References

American record labels
Record labels established in 1969